Brette is a commune in the Drôme department, administrative region of Auvergne-Rhône-Alpes, France.

Population

See also
Communes of the Drôme department

References

Communes of Drôme